Bull Creek is a suburb of Perth, Western Australia, located within the local government area of City of Melville. The suburb lies to the south of a creek of the same name, which flows into the Canning River.

History
Prior to European settlement, Bull Creek was inhabited by Aboriginal people from the Wadjuk Beeliar tribe. They used the wetlands as a summer source of food and fresh water. The area is significant to the Beeliar and is referred to as Gabbiljee, the watery place at the end of the river. 

The name was adopted by the City of Melville Council in December 1968. A larger grant of  later in that year was made to Thomas Middleton; it is this land that today makes up the largest part of the suburb. The name, Bull Creek is also often, but incorrectly, written as the single word "Bullcreek".

Education
Bull Creek is served by both government and private schools. The suburb has two state primary schools, Bull Creek Primary and Oberthur Primary. All Saints' College is a private school situated on the northern side of the suburb. Bull Creek is served by three state government high schools; Rossmoyne Senior High School takes students residing north of Parry Avenue, Leeming Senior High School takes students from south of Parry Avenue. Students living south of Parry Avenue and east of Wheatley Drive (both sides) can also choose to go to Willetton Senior High School. There are also a number of private schools in the nearby suburbs of Bateman, Murdoch and Winthrop.

Transport
Bull Creek railway station is situated in the Kwinana Freeway median strip at Leach Highway, the inter-suburban Mandurah railway line running perpendicular to Leach Highway.  The station features integrated bus services on the concourse level; this level operates as a bus station. The station officially opened on 23 December 2007 and services both the Perth CBD and the neighbouring city of Mandurah.

Facilities
On the southern side of Bull Creek on South Street, is the Stockland Bull Creek shopping centre. It has a wide range of shops including a supermarket, a large discount department store, large liquor store and bar as well as about 50 smaller speciality shops. There are also a number of fast food restaurants and banks in its vicinity. A smaller shopping area is also located in Parry Avenue and comprises an independent supermarket (open 7 days a week), chemist, newsagency, a number of small eateries and real estate agents.

The Aviation Heritage Museum is located on Bull Creek Drive. It is operated by the RAAF Association of Western Australia.

Parkland
Bull Creek has numerous parks, including John Creaney Park. The reserve is named after a manager of Hooker and Rex Estates, who established the park when subdividing.

References

External links

 
Suburbs of Perth, Western Australia
Canning River (Western Australia)
Suburbs in the City of Melville